SRS or SrS may stand for:

Organizations and companies
 Savez Radio-Amatera Srbije, a Serbian amateur radio organization
 Sea Research Society, for diving and underwater archaeology
 Serbian Radical Party (Srpska radikalna stranka), a political party in Serbia
 Special Repair Service, a British construction organization in World War II
 Stanford Research Systems, a test and measurement instruments manufacturer
 Scoliosis Research Society
 Socialist Revolutionary Party, or "Essers", from the late Imperial and early Soviet periods
 Society for Renaissance Studies, a UK-based academic society 
 Spanish Riding School, an Austrian equestrian institution
 Sperry Rail Service, a rail inspection contractor
 SRS Cinemas, in India
 SRS Labs, an American audio technology engineering company
 Surveillance and Response Support, a unit of the European Centre for Disease Prevention and Control
 Southwick Regional School, a public high school in Massachusetts, United States
 Suffolk Records Society, in the UK

Medicine
 Sex reassignment surgery, now called gender-affirming surgery
 Silver–Russell syndrome, a growth disorder
 Slipping rib syndrome, a painful condition affecting the ribs
 Slow-reacting substance of anaphylaxis, a type of secretion
 Social Responsiveness Scale, a measure of autistic traits 
 Somatostatin receptor scintigraphy, used to find carcinoid and other types of tumors
 Snyder–Robinson syndrome, a genetic disorder
 Spontaneous reporting system, a reporting system for drug adverse reactions
 Stereotactic radiosurgery

Math, science, and technology

Science 
Shock response spectrum, a graphical representation of vibrations
 Spontaneous Raman spectroscopy
 Stimulated Raman spectroscopy, the inelastic scattering of photons
 String rewriting system, in computer science and mathematical logic
 Strontium sulfide (SrS), an inorganic compound
 Synchrotron Radiation Source, an X-ray facility in Cheshire, England

Mathematics 
 Simple random sample, a method of sampling in statistics
Stratified random sample, a related method of sampling

Software
 Sender Rewriting Scheme, an email mechanism
 Sequence Retrieval System, bioinformatic software by LION Bioscience AG
 Software requirements specification, a document of a software system to be developed
 Street Racing Syndicate, a video game
 Spaced repetition software, a learning tool

Technology
 Cirrus SRS, a light-sport aircraft
 Salvo rocket system, a calque of the Russian name for a multiple launch rocket system
 Sound Retrieval System, an audio processing technology
 Space research service, a radiocommunication service using spacecraft or other objects in space
 Spatial reference system, used to locate geographical entities by coordinate
 Supplementary Restraint System, a type of automobile airbag
 Solvent recovery system, an emission control method typically using activated carbon

Other uses
 Savannah River Site, a US Department of Energy nuclear facility
 Selhurst railway station, London, England, National Rail station code
 Social Reporting Standard, a method of reporting business responsibility
 Stealth Recon Scout, a sniper rifle made by Desert Tech
 Standard RPG System, a Japanese role-playing game system
 SRS (sailing), a handicapping system
 1st Strategic Reconnaissance Squadron, in the US Air Force
 Security Response Section, a unit of South Australia Police